This is a list of Iranian football transfers for the 2019 summer transfer window. Only moves from Persian Gulf Pro League and Azadegan League are listed.
The summer transfer window will begin on 5 June 2019 and closes at midnight on 28 August 2019.
Players without a club may join at any time. This list includes transfers featuring at least one Iran Football League club which were completed after the end of the winter 2018–19 transfer window on 3 February and before the end of the 2019 summer window.

Rules and regulations 
According to Iran Football Federation rules for 2019–20 Persian Gulf Pro League, each Football Club is allowed to take up to maximum 6 new Iranian player from the other clubs who already played in the 2018–19 Persian Gulf Pro League season. In addition to these six new players, each club is allowed to take up to maximum 4 non-Iranian new players (at least one of them should be Asian) and up to 3 players from Free agent (who did not play in 2019–20 Persian Gulf Pro League season or doesn't list in any 2019–20 League after season's start) during the season. In addition to these players, the clubs are also able to take some new under-23 and under-21 years old players, if they have some free place in these categories in their player lists. Under-23 players should sign in transfer window but under-21 can be signed during the first mid-season. On 5 July 2018, a new rule was confirmed by Iran Football Federation which allows the clubs to move up to three players into their under-25 years old players list. These under-25 years old players must be under contract of the club in the previous season.

Players limits
The Iranian Football Clubs who participate in 2019–20 Iranian football different levels are allowed to have up to maximum 45 players in their player lists, which will be categorized in the following groups:
 Up to maximum 18 adult (without any age limit) players
 Up to maximum 3 under-25 players (i.e. the player whose birth is after 1 January 1995).
 Up to maximum 11 under-23 players (i.e. the player whose birth is after 1 January 1997).
 Up to maximum 15 under-21 players (i.e. the player whose birth is after 1 January 1999).

Iran Pro League

Esteghlal

In

Out

Foolad

In

Out

Gol Gohar

In

Out

Machine Sazi

In

Out

Naft Masjed-Soleyman

In

Out

Nassaji

In

Out

Padideh

In

Out

Pars Jonoubi Jam

In

Out

Paykan

In

Out

Persepolis

In

Out

Saipa

In

Out

Sanat Naft

In

Out

Sepahan

In

Out

Shahin Bushehr

In

Out

Tractor

In

Out

Zob Ahan

In

Out

Notes and references

Football transfers summer 2019
2019–20
Transfers